Little India or India Town (less commonly known as Indian Street or India Bazaar) is an Indian or Desi (South Asian) sociocultural environment outside India or the subcontinent. It especially refers to an area with Indian residences and a diverse collection of Indian businesses. Frequently, Little Indias have Hindu temples, mosques, and gurdwaras. They may also host celebrations of national and religious festivals and serve as gathering places for South Asians. As such, they are microcosms of India. Little Indias are often tourist attractions and are frequented by fans of Indian cuisine, Indian culture, Indian clothing, Indian music, and Indian cinema.

North America

Canada

Alberta
 34 Avenue Northwest, Edmonton
 Falconridge Boulevard Northeast, Calgary
 Mill Woods, Edmonton
 Taradale, Calgary

British Columbia

Metro Vancouver Regional District: With a population of 291,500, South Asians constitute 12% of the region's population, the second-largest South Asian population in Canada, after Toronto.
South Vancouver (17.2% South Asian)
Sunset (33.6% South Asian)
Punjabi Market, the oldest Little India in North America
Victoria-Fraserview (10.9% South Asian)
Surrey (32.4% South Asian)
Newton (58% South Asian)
Whalley (51% South Asian)
Fleetwood (32% South Asian)
City Centre (14% South Asian)
Cloverdale (14% South Asian)
Guildford (12% South Asian)
Delta (20.3% South Asian)
North Delta (32.7% South Asian)
Burnaby
Edmonds (24.9% South Asian)
New Westminster
Queensborough (27.3% South Asian)
Richmond
Shellmont (22.6% South Asian)
Cambie (22.1% South Asian)
East Richmond (22% South Asian)
Bridgeport (20.3% South Asian)
Fraser Valley Regional District (13.8% South Asian)
Abbotsford (25.5% South Asian)

Manitoba
 Mandalay Drive, Winnipeg

Ontario

Carling Avenue, Ottawa
Toronto Metropolitan Area - with 643,370 Indo-Canadians as of the 2016 census (11% of the population of 5,862,855), the Toronto area has the highest per-capita proportion and second largest total population of Asian Indians in the Western Hemisphere after New York City. Including all South Asians brings this number up to 973,225 or 16.6% of the population.
Ajax (26.2% South Asian - 33,055 out of 126,245 residents)
Brampton (52.4% South Asian - 340,815 out of 650,165 residents and most populous North American city with a South Asian majority)
Markham (17.6% South Asian - 59,485 out of 337,255 residents)
Milton (28.2% South Asian - 37,100 out of 131,430 residents)
Mississauga (25.3% South Asian - 180,800 out of 712,825 residents)
Oakville (13.5% South Asian - 28,685 out of 212,060 residents)
Pickering
Richmond Hill
Scarborough (27.7% South Asian - 172,880 out of 623,610 residents)
Toronto (city) (14.0% South Asian - 385,440 out of 2,761,285 residents)
Etobicoke
Gerrard India Bazaar
Rexdale
Vaughan (11.2% South Asian - 35,890 out of 321,315 residents)
Argyle, London

Quebec
 Park Extension, Montreal

United States

Arizona
 India Plaza, East Apache Boulevard, Tempe

California

 Little India, Artesia
 Venice Boulevard, Los Angeles
 Black Mountain Road, San Diego
 San Francisco Bay Area
 Fremont
El Camino Real, Sunnyvale
Santa Clara
 University Avenue, Berkeley

Florida
 Baymeadows Road, Jacksonville
 East Fowler Avenue, Tampa
 Oakland Park Boulevard, Sunrise

Georgia
 Global Mall, Jimmy Carter Boulevard, Norcross
 Lawrenceville Highway, Decatur

Illinois

 Devon Avenue,  Chicago
 East Schaumburg Road, Schaumburg
 Mall of India, Illinois Route 59, Naperville
 Ogden Avenue, Naperville

Maryland
 New Hampshire Avenue, Takoma Park

Massachusetts
 Moody Street, Waltham
 Route 9, Shrewsbury, Westborough, Grafton
 Cambridge St, Burlington

New Jersey

New Jersey, and Middlesex County in Central New Jersey, are home to by far the highest per capita Indian American populations of any U.S. state and U.S. county, respectively, at 3.9% and 14.1%, by 2013 U.S. Census estimates.
Carteret – 13.6%
Cranbury CDP – 11.5% 
Cranbury Township – 10.5%
East Windsor – 12.8%
Edison – 28.3%
Franklin – 14.6%
Fords – 11.1%
Iselin – 37.4%
Monroe Township, New Jersey – 11.6% (2016)
North Brunswick – 18.3%
Parsippany – 17.3%
Piscataway – 18.3%
Plainsboro – 29.5%
Robbinsville CDP – 15.7%
Secaucus – 11.1%
South Brunswick – 27.1%
West Windsor – 19.2%
Woodbridge – 15.3%

India Square
India Square, also known as Little Gujarat, is a commercial and restaurant district in Bombay, on Newark Avenue, in Jersey City, Hudson County, New Jersey. The area is home to the highest concentration of Asian Indians in the Western Hemisphere, and is a rapidly growing Indian American ethnic enclave within the New York metropolitan area. The neighborhood is  centered on Newark Avenue, between Tonnele Avenue and JFK Boulevard, and is considered to be part of the larger Journal Square District. This area has been home to the largest outdoor Navratri festivities in New Jersey as well as several Hindu temples. This portion of Newark Avenue is lined with groceries including Patel Brothers and Subzi Mandi Cash & Carry, electronics vendors, video stores, clothing stores, and restaurants and is one of the busier pedestrian areas of this part of the city, often stopping traffic for hours.  According to the 2000 census, there were nearly 13,000 Indians living in this two-block stretch in Jersey City, up from 3,000 in 1980, increasing commensurately between 2000 and 2010. As of the 2010 Census, over 27,000 Asian Indians accounted for 10.9% of Jersey City's population, the highest proportion of any major U.S. city.

Oak Tree Road (Edison/Iselin)
Oak Tree Road is a rapidly growing South Asian-focused commercial strip in Middlesex County, New Jersey, the U.S. county with highest concentration of Asian Indians (nearly 20% in 2020) and the geographic heart of the Northeast megalopolis. The Oak Tree Road strip runs for about one-and-a-half miles through Edison and neighboring Iselin, New Jersey, near the area's sprawling Chinatown and Koreatown. Little India in Edison and Iselin is the largest and most diverse South Asian cultural hub in the United States. The zone is home to over 400 South Asian establishments and businesses, including dining, apparel and electronics retailing, and entertainment. Over 60 Indian and Pakistani restaurants alone are found in the area. In Middlesex County, election ballots are printed in Gujarati, Hindi, and Punjabi as well. Edison was, per 2010 American Community Survey census data, 28.3% ethnic Asian Indian population, the highest percentage for any municipality in the United States. According to the 2017 American Community Survey, 42.6% of Iselin residents identified themselves as being Indian American, the highest percentage for any census-designated place in the United States.

New York

 Capital District
 Menands
 Long Island
 Bellerose, 15.1% Asian Indian
 Broadway/Route 107, Old Country Road, Hicksville, Nassau County. Hicksville is 17.4% Asian Indian.
 New Hyde Park, 20.2% Asian Indian.
Manhasset Hills, Nassau County - per 2000 Census, 12.4% Asian Indian
 New York City – With an estimated 711,174 uniracial individuals by 2017 U.S. Census estimates, the New York City metropolitan area contains the largest metropolitan Asian Indian population in the Western Hemisphere.
 Manhattan
 Lexington Avenue, in the neighborhood of Rose Hill, between 27th and 29th streets (growing preponderance of South Indian cuisine), has become known as Curry Hill as a result of the presence of old Kalustyan's spice shop, developing rapidly as Manhattan's Indian population nearly doubled between the 2000 and 2010 Census.
 East 6th Street, between 1st and 2nd avenues, also with many restaurants, and known as Curry Row.
 Queens
 Flushing, in vicinity of the Hindu Temple Society of North America, representing Sri Maha Vallabha Ganapati Devasthanam, (Tamil : ஸ்ரீ மஹா வல்லப கணபதி தேவஸ்தானம Telugu:శ్రీ మహావల్లభ గణపతి దేవస్థానం Sanskrit: श्री महावल्लभ गणपति देवस्थानम्), at 45–57 Bowne Street, Flushing, Queens, in New York City
Hillside Avenue, Bellerose Manor
Hillside Avenue, Floral Park
Hillside Avenue, Glen Oaks
Hillside Avenue, Jamaica
73rd and 74th Streets between Roosevelt and 37th avenues, Jackson Heights
Liberty Avenue, Richmond Hill
South Ozone Park, 11% Asian Indian
South Richmond Hill, 22% Asian Indian
Punjab Avenue, Richmond Hill (Little Punjab)
 Western New York
 3rd Street, Niagara Falls

North Carolina
 Charlotte area
 Pineville-Matthews Road, Pineville
 University City Blvd, Charlotte
 Raleigh–Durham–Chapel Hill area
 East Chatham Street, Cary. Cary is 10.6% Asian Indian.
 Morrisville, 30.4% Asian Indian

Ohio

Cincinnati area
 Lebanon Road, Sharonville
Cleveland area
 Pearl Road, Middleburg Heights
Columbus area
 Sancus Blvd, Polaris
 Sawmill Road, Dublin

Pennsylvania
Millbourne/Upper Darby

Texas

 Belt Line Road, Richardson
 Irving
 Mahatma Gandhi District, Houston
Eldorado Parkway, Frisco 
 Evers, Fredericksburg, and Wurzbach Roads near University of Texas Health Science Center, San Antonio

Africa

South Africa
 Durban (24.0% Asian Indian) - With about 800,000 - 900,000 people of Indian descent living in this city as of 2011, this city is considered to be the largest "Indian" city outside of India. In earlier decades, Indians used to be scattered across South Africa, but the 1946 Asiatic Land Tenure Act concentrated Indians to certain residential areas, destroying multicultural townships.
 Fordsburg
 Lenasia
 Pietermaritzburg (9.8% Indian or other Asian)

Tanzania
 Upanga, Dar Es Salaam
 Kisutu, Dar Es Salaam
 Arusha

Zambia
 Emmasdale
 Kamwala

Asia

Bahrain
 Manama Souq, Manama

Hong Kong
 Chungking Mansions, Hong Kong

Indonesia

 Pasar Baru, Jakarta
 Kampung Madras, Medan

Japan
 Nishi-Kasai, Edogawa, Tokyo

Malaysia

 Little India, (Jalan Tengku Kelana), Klang
 Brickfields (Jalan Tun Sambanthan), Kuala Lumpur
 Jalan Welman, Pekan Lama Rawang, Rawang, Selangor
 Jalan Masjid India, Kuala Lumpur
 Little India, Penang
 Paya Besar, Kulim, Kedah
 Jalan Taming Sari, Taiping, Perak
 Little India, Ipoh, Perak
 Jalan Bendahara - Jalan Temenggong intersection in Bandar Hilir, Melaka
 Little India, Malacca
 Jalan Yam Tuan, Seremban
 Jalan Trus, Johor Bahru, Johor
 Jalan India (formerly known as Kling Street), Kuching, Sarawak

Myanmar
 Mugal Road, Yangon

Philippines
 United Nations Avenue, Paco, Manila

Saudi Arabia
 Al Hara, Riyadh
 Al Azzizeyah, Jeddah

Singapore

 Little India

Thailand
 Phahurat, Bangkok
 Thanon Pan, Silom, Bangkok
 Indra Square, Bangkok

United Arab Emirates
In the UAE, Indians constitute more than 27% of the population. Here are some areas with a comparatively larger concentration of Indians.
 Bur Dubai, Dubai
 Al Karama, Dubai
 Satwa, Dubai
 Ras al-Khaimah
 Sharjah
 Umm al-Quwain
 Fujairah
 Abu Dhabi
 Ajman

Oman
The Sultanate of Oman is home to many expatriates, of which Indians form the largest constituency. The southeastern side of the business district of Ruwi is known as Muscat's Little India.
 Ghallah
 Ruwi

Europe

France
 Paris, La Chapelle and around Gare du Nord

Germany
 Frankfurt, on the corner of Münchner and Weser street.

Italy
 Via Principe Amedeo, 303/305, 00185 Roma, Italy

Spain
 Calle de Lavapiés, 28012 Madrid, Spain, Lavapies, Madrid

The Netherlands
 The Hague, Paul Krügerlaan, Transvaal (shopping street)

Norway
 Tøyengata and Oslo

United Kingdom

 Belgrave, Leicester, Leicestershire
 Blackburn, Lancashire
 Brent, London
 Brick Lane, London
 Ealing, London
 East Ham, London
 Forest Gate, London
 Green Street, Newham, London
 Govanhill, Glasgow
 Handsworth, Birmingham
 Harrow, London
 Hyson Green, Nottingham
 Ilford, London
 Kingsbury, London
 Latimer, Leicester, Leicestershire
 Manor Park, London
 New Malden, London
 Preston, Lancashire
 Rusholme, Manchester
 Curry Mile
 Sharrow, Sheffield
 Slough, Berkshire
 Southall, London
 Stratford, London
 Tooting, London
 Uxbridge, London
 Wembley, London
 Walthamstow, London
 Wolverhampton, West Midlands

Oceania

Australia

New South Wales
 Harris Park, a suburb in the City of Parramatta, is recognised as the "Little India" of Sydney, with a concentration of Indian restaurants and other businesses catering to Indian cultural needs.

Queensland
 Logan Road, Upper Mount Gravatt

South Australia
 Market Street, Adelaide

Victoria
 Little India (Foster Street), Dandenong

New Zealand
Papatoetoe
 Sandringham Road, Sandringham, Auckland

See also
Greater India
Indianisation
Indosphere
Non-resident Indian and person of Indian origin

References

India-related lists